Tetrabromoauric acid is an inorganic compound with the formula . It is the bromide analog of chloroauric acid. It is generated analogously, by reacting a mixture of hydrobromic and nitric acids with elemental gold.

References

Acids
Gold(III) compounds
Gold–halogen compounds
Bromometallates
Aurates